The Fajã do Valado is a permanent debris field, built from the collapsing cliffs on the northern coast of the civil parish of Rosais, in the municipality of Velas, island of São Jorge, in the Portuguese archipelago of the Azores.

There are less than a dozen homes on the fajãs, supported by a series of cisterns providing potable water. Around 1949, a couple began to live in the fajã, and constructed a mill to mill corn. They continued to live there for the next twenty years. The area, much like other fajãs along the northern coast, is used for the cultivation of vegetables or the grazing of cattle. The growing period predominates between March and April, owing to stationary micro-climate, with harvests occurring between August and September.

References

See also

 List of fajãs in the Azores

São Jorge Island
Faja Valado
Valado